M67, M-67, or M.67 may refer to:

 M-67 (Michigan highway), a state highway in Michigan in the United States
 M67 grenade, a fragmentation hand grenade
 M67 motorway, a motorway in Greater Manchester, England
 M67 recoilless rifle, an anti-tank weapon
 The M-67 submachine gun; see MEMS M-52/60
 M67 Zippo, a flamethrower tank variant of the M48 Patton tank
 BMW M67, a 1998 turbodiesel automobile engine
 Mauser M67, a rifle made by Kongsberg Våpenfabrikk based on M/98k actions, which again were based on captured Karabiner 98k (K98k) actions
 Macchi M.67, an Italian racing floatplane of 1929
 Messier 67, an open star cluster in the constellation Cancer